The 12th Annual Tony Awards took place at the Waldorf-Astoria Grand Ballroom on April 13, 1958.  Bud Collyer was the Master of Ceremonies. For the second year the program was not telecast, due to a strike against WCBS-TV.

The ceremony
Presenters: Sydney Chaplin, Greer Garson, Judy Holliday, Celeste Holm, Nancy Kelly, Mary Martin, Elsa Maxwell, Laurence Olivier, Tyrone Power, Martha Scott, Phil Silvers, Walter Slezak. Performers were Mindy Carson and Bill Hayes. Music was by Meyer Davis and his Orchestra.

Winners and nominees
Winners are in bold

Special awards
New York Shakespeare Festival, for presenting free performances in Central Park and the Hecksher Theater
Mrs. Louise Beck, for fifteen years of untiring dedication to the American Theatre Wing, which she served as treasurer, secretary and chairman of the board of directors. (Presented by Elaine Perry, daughter of Antoinette Perry.) 
Circle in the Square, Phoenix Theatre, Esther Hawley

Multiple nominations and awards

These productions had multiple nominations:

9 nominations: The Music Man 
7 nominations: Jamaica, Look Homeward, Angel and Time Remembered  
6 nominations: Oh, Captain!, The Rope Dancers and West Side Story 
5 nominations: The Dark at the Top of the Stairs, New Girl in Town and Sunrise at Campobello
3 nominations: The Entertainer, Look Back in Anger and Two for The Seesaw
2 nominations: Orpheus Descending and Romanoff and Juliet 

The following productions received multiple awards.

6 wins: The Music Man 
4 wins: Sunrise at Campobello
2 wins: New Girl in Town, Time Remembered and West Side Story

References

External links
 Tony Awards official website

Tony Awards ceremonies
1958 in theatre
1958 awards
1958 in the United States
1958 in New York City
1958 awards in the United States
April 1958 events in the United States